The InterContinental Jordan Hotel is a historic hotel in Jabal Amman between the 2nd and 3rd circles in Amman, Jordan.

History
The hotel was constructed by a Swiss-German company at a cost of $2 million, and opened in January 1962 as the Al Urdon Hotel. It joined Intercontinental Hotels on May 1, 1964 as the Hotel Jordan Intercontinental. It is operated by the Intercontinental Hotels Group and owned by the Jordan Hotels and Tourism Co. The hotel has 391 rooms and 49 suites, as well as internal and external swimming pools.

See also

 Zara Investment Holding
 Tourism in Jordan
 Intercontinental Hotels Group

References

Hotels in Amman
Hotels established in 1962
Hotel buildings completed in 1962
Hotels in Jordan